Tupã is a municipality in the state of São Paulo in Brazil. The population is 65,570 (2020 est.) in an area of 628 km². The city is located in the Alta Paulista Region and it is located 530 km (329.32 sq mi) from capital São Paulo.
It was founded on October 12, 1929 by Luiz de Souza Leão a business man that chose the region that were tropical forest. The city is located between 2 rivers: Aguapeí River and Rio do Peixe.

The city is named after a god of thunder in the Guaraní mythology.

References

External links
  Tupã City Hall Website
  Tourism Information (provided by the City Hall)
  Satellite image of Tupã on Google Maps